Rouge Remixes is a remix album by Brazilian girl group Rouge, released in Brazil in 2002. This double album features the band's debut album remixed by DJs Cuca and Memê with two bonus tracks, "Depois Que Tudo Mudou" (Cuca Club Remix) and Popstar megamix (Album Version), Não Dá pra Resistir/Beijo Molhado/Depois Que Tudo Mudou.

And the CD2 a video CD, which can be read by computer and DVDs and highlights three tracks of video, "Ragatanga", "Nunca Deixe De Sonhar" and "Não Dá Pra Resistir". The album sold about 150,000 copies and became a sensation in the dance clubs all over Brazil, with hits like Ragatanga (Cuca R&B Mix) and Cuca Club Remix.

Track listing

Notes

Rouge (group) albums
2002 remix albums
2002 compilation albums
Portuguese-language remix albums
Albums produced by Rick Bonadio
Sony Music Brazil albums
Columbia Records remix albums